Péter Kovács may refer to:

Péter Kovács (serial killer) (1934–1968), Hungarian serial killer
Péter Kovács (handballer) (born 1955), Hungarian Olympic handball player
Péter Kovács (gymnast) (born 1959), Hungarian gymnast
Péter Kovács (lawyer) (born 1959), Hungarian judge of the Constitutional Court
Péter Kovács (politician) (born 1971), Hungarian politician
Péter Kovács (footballer) (born 1978), Hungarian footballer
Péter Kovács (basketball) (born 1989), Hungarian basketball player
Péter Kovács (painter), 2008 recipient of the Kossuth Prize

See also
Péter Eckstein-Kovács (born 1956), Romanian lawyer and politician